Long Way Down is a young adult novel in verse by Jason Reynolds, published October 24, 2017, by Atheneum Books. The book was longlisted for the National Book Award and was named a Printz Honor Book, Coretta Scott King Honor Book, and Newbery Medal Honor Book, alongside other awards and positive reviews.

A graphic novel edition of the book, illustrated by Danica Novgorodoff, was published October 13, 2020.

Background 
Reynolds held the idea for Long Way Down for years before finally writing it. In 2003 when Reynolds was 19, he learned that a friend had been murdered. Speaking of the moment, he said he and his friends felt "an anger, a pain, like a cancer metastasizing by the second, spreading around [them] and through [them]. [They] knew his death had changed [them] chemically, and that [they] could do, perhaps, what [they] never knew [they] could do before. Kill." Reynolds continued, Long Way Down is meant to help us all recognize the weight of it. Not just the weight of gun violence, but the weight of anger bearing down on fragile backs. The weight of slow-burning psychosis. The weight of community codes, family dynamic, tradition. The weight of The Rules. The weight of guaranteed cold cases. The weight of fear, and the feeling of insignificance. The weight of dehumanization, of being stripped of personhood because of instinctual moments and feelings, unfettered. The weight of so many children—more specifically, so many black and brown children—jumping on this soiled American mattress, poverty, illiteracy, and prejudice serving as the coils.

Plot 
William Holloman is ready to exact vengeance on the person who murdered his older brother, Shawn. As Will rides the elevator down from his eighth-floor apartment, a new person, who is dead, gets on on each floor and tells a story about their lives, all connected to three rules of the neighborhood:

 Don't cry. 
 Don't snitch.
 Get revenge.

Most of the ghosts' stories revolve around that third rule, wherein one person died because they killed someone who killed someone connected to their family, creating a continuous cycle of hurt.

The full story takes place over the course of a minute.

Reception 
Long Way Down was a New York Times best seller and Junior Library Guild selection.

The book received starred reviews from Booklist, Bulletin of the Center for Children's Books, Horn Book, Kirkus, Publishers Weekly, and School Library Journal, as well as positive reviews from Shelf Awareness.

In reviews, the book was called "astonishing," "a tour de force," "powerful," and "intense."

Kirkus, Publishers Weekly, the New York Public Library, the Chicago Public Library, Entertainment Weekly, Vulture, Paste, Buzzfeed, Horn Book, and School Library Journal named Long Way Down one of the best young adult books of the year. The Washington Post included it in their list of "50 Notable Works of Fiction 2017."

TIME added it to their "100 Best YA Books of All Time" list, and Buzzfeed named it one of the best 30 young adult books of the decade.

Awards and honors

Graphic novel
A graphic novel edition of the book, illustrated by Danica Novgorodoff, was published October 13, 2020, by Atheneum. This graphic novel was the 2022 winner of the Kate Greenaway Medal.

Writing for Horn Book, Patrick Gall applauded the imagery, noting that artful decisions offer readers insight into Will’s emotional state at any given moment. The layered, fragmented layouts found across many spreads have potent impact, along with stylistic touches such as Polaroid photos, video screens, and storyboards seamlessly substituted for panels. Scenes of violence are starkly portrayed, including a double-page image of Shawn’s dead body; however, the complex and unjust reality of Will’s position remains front and center, in stark focus.In 2021, the American Library Association selected Long Way Down: The Graphic Novel one of their Great Graphic Novels for Teens.

References

2017 children's books
Michael L. Printz Award-winning works
Newbery Honor-winning works
African-American young adult novels
Atheneum Books books
Books by Jason Reynolds